Micrognathus is a genus of pipefishes, with these currently recognized species:
 Micrognathus andersonii (Bleeker, 1858) (shortnose pipefish)
 Micrognathus brevicorpus R. Fricke, 2004
 Micrognathus brevirostris (Rüppell, 1838)
 M. b. brevirostris (Rüppell, 1838) (thorntail pipefish)
 M. b. pygmaeus Fritzsche, 1981 (thorntailed pipefish)
 Micrognathus crinitus (Jenyns, 1842) (banded pipefish)
 Micrognathus erugatus Herald & C. E. Dawson, 1974
 Micrognathus micronotopterus (Fowler, 1938) (tidepool pipefish)
 Micrognathus natans C. E. Dawson, 1982 (offshore pipefish)

References

Syngnathidae
Marine fish genera
Taxa named by Georg Duncker